Atpara is the smallest upazila of Netrokona District, in the Division of Mymensingh, Bangladesh.

History

When the Baro-Bhuiyans were in power in Bengal, Atpara was a part of the Sarkar Bazuhar. It later became part of the parganas of Sirujial and Mymensingh. The zamindar (landlord) of Mymensingh Pargana, Brajendra Kishore Roy Chowdhury of Gouripur named this area as Brajer Bazaar (Braj's market) after himself. It was later renamed to Atpara, although some locals may still refer to it today as Brajer Bazaar.

During the Mughal period, a three-domed mosque was constructed in between the villages of Shormushia and Haripur. An established Hindu zamindar family later formed in the village of Rameshwarpur. The remnants of the family palace (Roy Bari) remains a popular tourist site.

The Village of Amati in Teligati Union, Atpara is quite notable. Social reformers such as Sonafor Uddin, Muktul Husayn Khan, Shariat Khan, Anfar Uddin, Manfar Uddin and Jafar Uddin were born in Amati. During British period, Shyam Biswas, a Bengali Hindu zamindar, was noted to be very cruel and abusive towards the local inhabitants. He had certain regulations such as no one being allowed to pass his front yard wearing shoes or slippers. The social reformers organised people against this humiliation, rising against Biswas. Their revolution was soon followed in other parts of the district. Amati became a symbol of revolution against tyrant landlords.

On 21 August 1917, Atpara was made a thana. During the Bangladesh Liberation War, freedom fighters attacked the Atpara Thana on 19 August 1971. They killed a number of Razakars as well as the officer-in-charge of the thana, and they also looted arms and ammunition from the thana. On 7 October, a battle was fought leading to the death of three more Razakars. Atpara was made an upazila on 2 July 1983.

Demographics

According to 2011 Bangladesh census, Atpara had a population of 144,624. Males constituted 49.87% of the population and females 50.13%. Muslims formed 90.81% of the population, Hindus 9.09%, Christians 0.01%, and others 0.09%. Atpara had a literacy rate of 38.7% for the population 7 years and above.

As of the 1991 Bangladesh census, Atpara had a population of 120491. Males constituted 51.15% of the population, and females 48.85%. This Upazila's eighteen up population is 60858. Atpara has an average literacy rate of 24% (7+ years), and the national average of 32.4% literate.

Administration

Atpara Thana was formed in 1926 and it was turned into an upazila on 2 July 1983.

Atpara Upazila is divided into seven union parishads: Baniyajan, Duoj, Lunesshor, Shormushia, Shunoi, Sukhari, and Teligati. The union parishads are subdivided into 139 mauzas and 177 villages.

Chairmen

Notable people
Khalekdad Chowdhury, author
Abdul Khaleq, assassinated politician

See also
 Upazilas of Bangladesh
 Districts of Bangladesh
 Divisions of Bangladesh

References

Atpara Upazila